Latvia participated in the Junior Eurovision Song Contest 2004 which took place on 20 November 2004, in Lillehammer, Norway. The Latvian broadcaster Latvijas Televīzija (LTV) organised a national final in order to select the Latvian entry for the 2004 contest. On 2 October 2004, Mārtiņš Tālbergs won the national final and was selected to represent Latvia with the song "Balts vai melns".

Before Junior Eurovision

National final
Ten entries were selected for the national final, and the competing artists and songs were announced on 20 August 2004.

The final took place on 2 October 2004 at the Jūras vārti Theatre in Ventspils, hosted by Rūta Reinika and Lauris Reiniks. Ten entries competed and the song with the highest number of votes from the public, "Balts vai melns" performed by Mārtiņš Tālbergs, was declared the winner.

At Junior Eurovision

Voting

References 

Junior Eurovision Song Contest
Croatia
Junior